The Poland national under-21 football team is the national under-21 football team of Poland and is controlled by the Polish Football Association.

This team is for Polish players aged 21 or under at the start of a two-year European Under-21 Football Championship campaign, so players can be, and often are, up to 23 years old.

The performance of Poland in the U-21 Euro is used to decide if Poland can qualify for the Summer Olympics. Since the team's foundation, Poland only managed to qualify once, the 1992 Summer Olympics thanked for having the best coefficence point among losing quarter-finalists in the 1992 UEFA European Under-21 Championship, but managed to finish second in the tournament.

Competitive record
*Denotes draws include knockout matches decided on penalty kicks.
Gold background colour indicates that the tournament was won.
Silver background colour indicates second place finish.
Bronze background colour indicates third place finish.
Red border color indicates tournament was held on home soil.

UEFA European U-21 Championship

UEFA European Under-21 Football Championship

2023 UEFA European Under-21 Championship qualification

Results and fixtures

Players

Current squad
Players born in or after 2002 are eligible for the 2025 UEFA European Under-21 Championship.

The following players were selected for the friendly matches against Austria and Albania on 24 and 27 March 2023.

Caps and goals updated as of 21 November 2022, after the match against . Names in italics denote players who have been capped for the senior team.

Recent call-ups
The following players (born in 2002 or later) have previously been called up to the Poland under-21 squad in the last 12 months and are still eligible to represent:

INJ Withdrew from the squad due to an injury.

SEN Player withdrew from the squad due to a call up to the senior team.

Coaching history
Note: List is not complete
 1972–1974 – Andrzej Strejlau
 1974–1975 – Ryszard Kulesza (U-21)
 1975–1978 – Ryszard Kulesza (U-23)
 1979–1982 – Waldemar Obrębski
 1983–1986 – Edmund Zientara
 1987–1989 – Bogusław Hajdas
 1990–1992 – Janusz Wójcik
 1992–1994 – Wiktor Stasiuk
 1994–1995 – Mieczysław Broniszewski
 1996–1997 – Edward Lorens
 1998–1999 – Paweł Janas
 2000–2001 – Lesław Ćmikiewicz
 2002–2003 – Edward Klejndinst
 2004–2005 – Władysław Żmuda
 2006–2010 – Andrzej Zamilski
 2011–2012 – Stefan Majewski
 2013–2017 – Marcin Dorna
 2017–2020 – Czesław Michniewicz
 2020–2022 – Maciej Stolarczyk
 2022–present – Michał Probierz

See also
 Poland national football team
 Poland Olympic football team
 Poland national under-20 football team
 Poland national under-19 football team
 Poland national under-18 football team
 Poland national under-17 football team
 Poland national under-16 football team

References

Notes

External links

 UEFA Under-21 website

European national under-21 association football teams
U